The 2013 FIBA Europe Under-16 Championship for Women Division B was the 10th edition of the Division B of the European basketball championship for women's national under-16 teams. It was played in Matosinhos, Portugal, from 1 to 11 August 2013. Serbia women's national under-16 basketball team won the tournament.

Participating teams

  (16th place, 2012 FIBA Europe Under-16 Championship for Women Division A)

  (15th place, 2012 FIBA Europe Under-16 Championship for Women Division A)

  (14th place, 2012 FIBA Europe Under-16 Championship for Women Division A)

First round
In the first round, the teams were drawn into four groups. The first two teams from each group will advance to the Quarterfinal Groups E and F and the other teams will advance to the 9th–17th place classification (Groups G, H and I).

Group A

Group B

Group C

Group D

1st–8th place classification

Group E

Group F

9th–17th place classification

Group G

Group H

Group I

15th–17th place classification

12th–14th place classification

9th–11th place classification

5th–8th place playoffs

Championship playoffs

Final standings

References

2013
2013–14 in European women's basketball
International youth basketball competitions hosted by Portugal
FIBA U16
August 2013 sports events in Europe